KKH 060 is an irregular galaxy and a low surface brightness galaxy located in the direction of the  constellation Leo at a distance of 4.89 million light years from Earth. The galaxy is close to the Local Group, but is not considered to be a member of it.

References

External links 

Dwarf galaxies
Irregular galaxies
Leo (constellation)